Richard Sergeant 	(executed at Tyburn, 20 April 1586) was an English Roman Catholic priest. He is a Catholic martyr, beatified in 1987.

Life

He was probably a younger son of Thomas Sergeant of Stone, Gloucestershire, by Katherine, daughter of John Tyre of Hardwick. He took his degree at the University of Oxford (20 February 1570–1), and arrived at the English College, Reims, on 25 July 1581.

He was ordained subdeacon at Reims (4 April 1582), deacon at Soissons (9 June 1582), and priest at Laon (7 April 1583). He said his first Mass on 21 April, and left for England on 10 September.

He was indicted at the Old Bailey (17 April 1586) as Richard Lea alias Longe.

William Thomson
Along with Richard Sergeant him was condemned and executed William Thomson, a native of Blackburn, Lancashire, who was educated at local schools before going to the English College at Reims, on 28 May 1583. He was ordained priest in the Reims cathedral (31 March 1583–4). Thomson laboured chiefly in London, and was arrested in the house of Roger Line, husband of Anne Line in Bishopsgate Without, while saying Mass.

Both were executed on 20 April 1586 for being Catholic priests and coming into the realm in violation of 27 Eliz. c 2.

Both were beatified by Pope John Paul II in 1987 and are commemorated on 4 May.

See also
 Douai Martyrs
 Eighty-five martyrs of England and Wales

References

Attribution
 The entry cites:
Richard Challoner, Missionary priests, I (London, 1878), nos. 32, 33
Thomas Francis Knox, Douay Diaries (London, 1878)
Joseph Foster, Alumni Oxonienses, (Oxford, 1892)
Harleian Society Publ. xxi (London, 1885), 258
John Hungerford Pollen, English Martyrs 1584–1603 in Cath. Rec. Soc. (London, 1908), 129
Catholic Record Society II (London, 1906), 249, 255, 271

1586 deaths
16th-century English Roman Catholic priests
English beatified people
16th-century venerated Christians
Eighty-five martyrs of England and Wales
Year of birth unknown
Executed people from Gloucestershire
People executed under Elizabeth I
People from Stroud District